Matti Killing (born on 17 March 1948 in Pärnu) is an Estonian rowing coach.

Killing graduated from the Tallinn Pedagogical Institute's Faculty of Physical Education. From 1965 until 1974, he won several medals at Estonian Rowing Championships.

Since 1962 he worked as a rowing coach.

Students: Marek Avamere, Kaspar Taimsoo, Allar Raja. 

Awards:
 2016: Estonian Coach of the Year
 2018: Order of the White Star, III class.

References

Living people
1948 births
Estonian male rowers
Estonian sports coaches
Recipients of the Order of the White Star, 3rd Class
Tallinn University alumni
Sportspeople from Pärnu